USS Branch (DD-197) was a  in the United States Navy that entered service in 1920. After a short active life, Branch was placed in reserve in 1922. The ship was activated again for World War II before being transferred to the Royal Navy in 1940. Renamed HMS Beverley, the destroyer served in the Battle of the Atlantic as a convoy escort and was torpedoed and sunk on 11 April 1943.

Construction and commissioning
The second Navy ship was named for Secretary of the Navy John Branch (1782–1863), Branch was launched on 19 April 1919 by Newport News Shipbuilding & Dry Dock Company; sponsored by Miss Laurie O'Brien Branch, grandniece of Secretary Branch. The destroyer was commissioned on 26 July 1920.

Service history

United States Navy service

Branch was fitted out at Norfolk Navy Yard and in October cruised to Annapolis, Maryland, for a test of her engineering performance. Before the end of 1920 she joined Destroyer Squadron 3, Atlantic Fleet. The next year she maneuvered with the Squadron and engaged in tactical exercises on the Atlantic coast, sometimes operating in reduced commission with half her usual complement of crew. After 6 January 1922 she operated in the vicinity of Charleston, South Carolina, and Hampton Roads. Arriving at Philadelphia Navy Yard in June, she was placed out of commission 11 August 1922.

Branch remained inactive at Philadelphia until recommissioned 4 December 1939 for service with the Scouting Force. As flagship of Destroyer Division 68 she participated in the Neutrality Patrol. In the summer of 1940 she operated along the United States East Coast and trained reserves. Early in October 1940 she departed Newport, Rhode Island for Halifax, Nova Scotia, where on 8 October 1940 Branch was decommissioned and transferred under the Destroyers for Bases Agreement to the United Kingdom for service in the Royal Navy and renamed HMS Beverley.

Royal Navy service

HMS Beverley arrived at Belfast 24 October and was modified for trade convoy escort service by removal of three of the original 4"/50 caliber guns and three of the triple torpedo tube mounts to reduce topside weight for additional depth charge stowage and installation of hedgehog. In April 1942 she was an escort for Convoy PQ 14 en route to North Russia. One merchant ship was sunk. The enemy returned four times and took part in short gunnery duels, but did not close the range below .

She also took part in attacks on other U-boats the next day.

Beverley was assigned to Escort Group B-4 of the Mid-Ocean Escort Force for convoys ON 140, ON 161, ON 169, HX 229 and ON 176. On 9 April while escorting Convoy ON 176, she collided with the steamship Cairnvolona in bad weather and had her anti-submarine and degaussing gear put out of action.

Notes

References 
 
 
 
 "HMS Beverley: A "Town" Afloat 1940–43 & The Town Ashore by Geoffrey Blewitt. Alan Twiddle Publishing 1998 .

External links 
       navsource.org: USS Branch
 hazegray.org: USS Branch

Clemson-class destroyers
1919 ships
Ships transferred from the United States Navy to the Royal Navy
Town-class destroyers of the Royal Navy
Town-class destroyers converted from Clemson-class destroyers
World War II destroyers of the United Kingdom
Ships sunk by German submarines in World War II
World War II shipwrecks in the Atlantic Ocean
Maritime incidents in April 1943
Ships built in Newport News, Virginia